Lepenica, Serbia may refer to several places:

Lepenica (Great Morava), a river in Šumadija district
Lepenica (region)
Lepenica (Vladičin Han), a village in the municipality of Vladičin Han, Pčinja District
Lepenica, Pčinja, a village in Pčinja District
Lepenica, Mačva, a village in Mačva District